Schifferstadt, Also known as Scheifferstadt, is the oldest standing house in Frederick, Maryland.  Built in 1758, it is one of the nation's finest examples of German-Georgian colonial architecture.  It was designated a National Historic Landmark in 2016.

History
The stone house was completed in 1758 as were the three cast iron five-plate stoves used to heat the rooms. Only one survives. The house stands on land settled by German immigrant farmer Josef Brunner (later alternately spelled 'Bruner' and 'Brooner') in 1736. In time, Brunner purchased  of a 7,000-acre tract land known as "Tasker's Chance" from Frederick Town (current-day Frederick) developer Daniel Dulany.  Brunner named the property after Klein Schifferstadt, his home town in the Rhineland-Palatinate region of southwestern Germany near Mannheim. Brunner's older sons purchased adjacent farms, bringing the total owned by the family to about 1000 acres.

Brunner built a log house on the site, cleared land, established a farm and lived there for several years. In 1753, he sold the property to his youngest son Elias, who clearly prospered enough to build the fairly large stone house that stands today. Josef moved into the nearby town of Frederick and is thought to have died later that year.

Architecture
The sandstone for Schifferstadt's two-foot-thick walls may have come from a local quarry near Walkersville Maryland. The hand-hewn wood beams were pinned together with wooden pegs.  Above the windows and doors on the first floor of the building are reinforcing stone arches, supporting the outside walls above them.  The roof is considered to be unusual with kick-up, or flared eaves. The house has a large "wishbone" chimney, gathering flues from all four fireplaces into one chimney. In the parlor and upstairs bedrooms were three "Five Plate" cast iron boxes that kept most of the house warm. Also called jamb stoves, these were parts of a clean, energy-efficient radiant heating system, fed by fireplaces in the center hall. One is still there—the only one anywhere known still to be in its original place—and is the basis for dating the house at 1758 because of the date cast into the plates. Much of the original construction and detailing survives, showing particular examples of German influence, including a tightly winding staircase to the second floor.  Schifferstadt is known to be the finest existing example of German colonial architecture in the United States.

Ownership, disrepair and restoration
The house was owned by Brunner's family and descendants until 1899 when it was sold (along with 94 acres) to Frederick resident Edward C. Krantz for $16,000. The house remained in the Krantz family until July 1974 when it was sold to Frederick County Landmarks Foundation.  The foundation subsequently restored 
Schifferstadt and today operates it as an architectural and local history museum.

Schifferstadt was listed on the National Register of Historic Places on July 22, 1974 and was designated a National Historic Landmark on December 23, 2016.

See also

List of National Historic Landmarks in Maryland
National Register of Historic Places listings in Frederick County, Maryland
https://fredericksistercitiesassociation.weebly.com/

References

External links
, including photo in 2004, at Maryland Historical Trust
Schifferstadt Architectural Museum

German-American culture in Maryland
Houses on the National Register of Historic Places in Maryland
Historic house museums in Maryland
Museums in Frederick County, Maryland
Houses in Frederick County, Maryland
Palatine German settlement in Maryland
National Register of Historic Places in Frederick County, Maryland
National Historic Landmarks in Maryland